The canton of Entre Seille et Meurthe is an administrative division of the Meurthe-et-Moselle department, northeastern France. It was created at the French canton reorganisation which came into effect in March 2015. Its seat is in Dieulouard.

It consists of the following communes:

Abaucourt
Armaucourt
Arraye-et-Han
Autreville-sur-Moselle
Belleau
Belleville
Bey-sur-Seille
Bezaumont
Bouxières-aux-Dames
Bratte
Brin-sur-Seille
Chenicourt
Clémery
Custines
Dieulouard
Éply
Faulx
Jeandelaincourt
Landremont
Lanfroicourt
Lay-Saint-Christophe
Létricourt
Leyr
Mailly-sur-Seille
Malleloy
Millery
Moivrons
Montenoy
Morville-sur-Seille
Nomeny
Phlin
Port-sur-Seille
Raucourt
Rouves
Sainte-Geneviève
Sivry
Thézey-Saint-Martin
Ville-au-Val
Villers-lès-Moivrons

References

Cantons of Meurthe-et-Moselle